Scopula donaria is a moth of the  family Geometridae. It is found in south-eastern Brazil.

References

Moths described in 1901
donaria
Moths of South America